The 1957–58 Sheffield Shield season was the 56th season of the Sheffield Shield, the domestic first-class cricket competition of Australia. New South Wales won the championship for the fifth consecutive year.

Table

Statistics

Most Runs
Norm O'Neill 1005

Most Wickets
Ian Quick 32

References

Sheffield Shield
Sheffield Shield
Sheffield Shield seasons